Bernard Harry Port (14 December 1925 - 27 August 2007) is an English footballer, who played as a goalkeeper in the Football League for Chester.

References

Chester City F.C. players
Hull City A.F.C. players
Bangor City F.C. players
Association football goalkeepers
English Football League players
Sportspeople from Burton upon Trent
1925 births
2007 deaths
English footballers